Sandomierz Voivodeship was a unit of administration and local government in Poland from the 14th century to the partitions of Poland in 1772–1795. It was part of the Lesser Poland region. Originally Sandomierz Voivodeship also covered the area around Lublin, but in 1474 its three eastern counties were organized into Lublin Voivodeship.  In the 16th century, it had 374 parishes, 100 towns and 2586 villages. The voivodeship was based on the Sandomerz ziemia, which earlier was the Duchy of Sandomierz. The Duchy of Sandomierz was created in 1138 by King Bolesław III Wrymouth, who in his testament divided Poland into five principalities. One of them, with the capital at Sandomierz, was assigned to Krzywousty's son, Henry of Sandomierz. Later on, with southern part of the Seniorate Province (which emerged into the Duchy of Krakow), the Duchy of Sandomierz created Lesser Poland, divided into Kraków and Sandomierz Voivodeships.

Sandomierz Voivodeship was also one of the voivodeships of Congress Poland. Created in 1816 from the Radom Department, in 1837 it was transformed into the Sandomierz Governorate.

14th century-1795

Boundaries
Sandomierz Voivodeship in its original shape was one of the largest provinces of the Kingdom of Poland. After Lublin Voivodeship was created out of its eastern territories, the province stretched from Białobrzegi in the north, to the area north of Krosno in the south (the town of Krosno itself belonged to Red Ruthenia). It included such cities and towns of contemporary Poland, as Dębica, Dęblin, Iłża, Kielce, Kolbuszowa, Końskie, Kozienice, Lipsko, Mielec, Nisko, Opoczno, Ostrowiec Świętokrzyski, Pińczów, Pionki, Radom, Ropczyce, Ryki, Stalowa Wola, Starachowice, Staszów, Szydłowiec, Tarnów, Tarnobrzeg and Włoszczowa. The shape of the voivodeship remained unchanged from 1474 to the first partition of Poland (1772), when the Habsburg monarchy annexed the area south of the Vistula, with Dębica, Kolbuszowa, Mielec, Nisko and Tarnów.

Zygmunt Gloger in his monumental book Historical Geography of the Lands of Old Poland gives a detailed description of Sandomierz Voivodeship:

“Duke Boleslaw Krzywousty, before his death in 1138, divided Poland between his four sons, giving Henryk the Land of Sandomierz together with the Land of Lublin. The Duchy of Sandomierz was thus created (...)

During the reign of Wladyslaw Lokietek, the duchy was turned into a large voivodeship. In ca. 1471, the Land of Lublin was separated from it (...) The area of Sandomierz Voivodeship was 467 square miles, with 374 Roman Catholic parishes, 100 towns, and 2,586 villages. In 1397 left bank part of the province was divided into three counties – Sandomierz, Radom and Checiny. In the early 16th century the voivodeship had 9 counties: Sandomierz, Wislica, Checiny, Opoczno, Radom, Szydlow, Stezyca, Pilzno and Tarnów. By late 16th century, Tarnow county was annexed by Pilzno county, while Szydlow county was divided between Wislica and Sandomierz (...)

Sandomierz Voivodeship had nine senators: the voivode and the castellan of Sandomierz, and castellans of Wislica, Radom, Zawichost, Żarnów, Malogoszcz, Polaniec and Czchow. The voivodeship had several starostas, who resided in such towns, as Sandomierz, Radom, Checiny, Opoczno, Nowy Korczyn, Stezyca, Wislica, Pilzno, Stopnica, Solec nad Wisla, Zawichost, Szydlow, Przedborz, Ropczyce, Ryczywol, Radoszyce, Ryki, Zwolen, Gołąb and others. Local sejmiks took place at Opatow, at which seven deputies to the Sejm were elected, as well as two deputies to the Lesser Poland Tribunal in Lublin (...)

Soil in northern part of the voivodeship was sandy, while in its center and south it was very rich. In the area of Opatow, famous wheat was produced, called sandomierka or opatowka. There also were large forests, as well as deposits of marble, copper, iron and lime (...) Among oldest urban centers of Sandomierz Voivodeship were Sandomierz, Wislica, Nowy Korczyn, Zawichost, Radom. Main castles were at Chrobrze, Osiek, Ilza, Checiny, Janowiec nad Wisla. Most important monasteries were at Lysa Gora, Sieciechow, Opatow, Wachock and Koprzywnica".

Municipal government
Voivodeship Governor (Wojewoda) seat:
 Sandomierz

Regional council (sejmik generalny) seats:
 Nowe Miasto Korczyn

Administrative division
In 1397, part of the Sandomierz Voivodeship which was located on the western bank of the Vistula, was divided into three counties:
 Sandomierz County (Powiat Sandomierski), Sandomierz
 Radom County (Powiat Radomski), Radom, which was traditionally called Radom Land (Ziemia radomska)
 Chęciny County (Powiat Chęciński), Chęciny.

In 1662, Sandomierz Voivodeship consisted of the following counties:
 Sandomierz County,
 Chęciny County,
 Wiślica County,
 Stężyca County,
 Radom County,
 Opoczno County,
 Pilzno County.

Voivodes
 Jan z Melsztyna (since 1361)
 Jan z Tarnowa (before 1385)
 Spytek z Tarnowa i Jarosławia (since 1433)
 Jan Feliks "Szram" Tarnowski (since 1501)
 Mikołaj Firlej (since 1514)
 Jan Kostka (since 1574)
 Jerzy Mniszech (since 1590)
 Jan Zbigniew Ossoliński (since 1613)
 Stanisław Koniecpolski (since 1625 to 1633),
 Mikołaj Firlej (1633–1635)
 Jerzy Ossoliński (XI 1636-III 1638)
 Krzysztof Ossoliński (since IV 1638 to 1645)
 Władysław Dominik Zasławski (since 1649)
 Aleksander Koniecpolski (since 1656)
 Jan "Sobiepan" Zamoyski (since 1659)
 Jerzy Aleksander Lubomirski (since 1729)
 Jan Tarło (since 1736)

Cities and towns of Sandomierz Voivodeship (1662)

Cities and towns of Sandomierz County 
 Sandomierz,
 Opatów,
 Koprzywnica (Pokrzywnica),
 Połaniec,
 Osiek,
 Staszów,
 Łagów,
 Nowa Słupia,
 Bodzentyn,
 Wąchock,
 Ćmielów,
 Kunów,
 Lasocin,
 Rudnik nad Sanem,
 Iwaniska,
 Zawichost,
 Tarłów,
 Mielec,
 Janików,
 Ożarów,
 Waśniów.

Cities and towns of Chęciny County 
 Chęciny,
 Przedbórz,
 Kurzelów,
 Secemin,
 Małogoszcz,
 Włoszczowa,
 Oksa (Oxa),
 Sobków,
 Daleszyce.

Cities and towns of Wiślica County 
 Wiślica,
 Nowy Korczyn,
 Szydłów,
 Pierzchnica (Pierśnica),
 Pińczów,
 Busko,
 Opatowiec,
 Pacanów,
 Żabno,
 Stopnica (Stobnica),
 Kurozwęki,
 Oleśnica,
 Chmielnik.

Cities and towns of Stężyca County 
 Stężyca,
 Żelechów,
 Łaskarzew,
 Bobrowniki,
 Okrzeja,
 Adamów (Jadamów),
 Jeziorzany (known in 1662 as Łysobyki),
 Wojcieszków,
 Maciejowice.

Cities and towns of Radom County 
 Radom,
 Ciepielów,
 Skaryszew,
 Iłża,
 Szydłowiec,
 Zwoleń,
 Przytyk,
 Wierzbnik (now a district of Starachowice),
 Jedlińsk (Jedleńsko),
 Odechów,
 Jastrząb,
 Nieznamierowice (Znamierowice),
 Klwów,
 Skrzynno,
 Sieciechów,
 Solec nad Wisłą,
 Kozienice.

Cities and towns of Opoczno County 
 Opoczno,
 Gowarczów,
 Białaczów,
 Fałków,
 Odrzywół,
 Drzewica,
 Gielniów.

Cities and towns of Pilzno County 
 Pilzno,
 Strzyżów,
 Rzochów,
 Tuchów,
 Brzostek,
 Ropczyce,
 Frysztak,
 Kołaczyce,
 Sędziszów Małopolski,
 Dębica,
 Wielopole Skrzyńskie,
 Czudec,
 Głogów Małopolski,
 Niebylec,
 Przecław,
 Tarnów,
 Brzyska (Rzyska),
 Radomyśl Wielki.

Neighbouring Voivodeships 
 Rawa Voivodeship
 Mazovian Voivodeship
 Lublin Voivodeship
 Ruthenian Voivodeship
 Kraków Voivodeship
 Sieradz Voivodeship
 Łęczyca Voivodeship

1939 

Sandomierz Voivodeship was also a proposed voivodeship of Second Polish Republic, which never was created because of the Nazi and Soviet invasion of Poland in September 1939. The idea of creation of this unit was the brainchild of Minister of Industry and Trade Eugeniusz Kwiatkowski, and it was directly linked with creation of one of the biggest economic projects of interbellum Poland, Central Industrial Region. It was to cover south-central Poland, and most probably, it was to be created in late 1939. Its projected size was 24.500 square kilometers, and it was to incorporate 20 or 21 powiats.

References 
Zygmunt Gloger, Historical Geography of Lands of Ancient Poland, Sandomierz Voivodeship (in Polish)

 
Voivodeships of the Polish–Lithuanian Commonwealth
1795 disestablishments in the Polish–Lithuanian Commonwealth
States and territories established in the 14th century
History of Lesser Poland
14th-century establishments in Poland